Don Bosco Technical Institute in Tarlac City (formerly, Don Bosco Academy), or simply Don Bosco Tarlac, is a private Catholic school for pre-school, grade school and junior high school boys. In 2016, it opened its co-educational senior high school department. The first Don Bosco school in the Philippines, it is the only academic-technical school in Tarlac. Its campus is located in Sto. Cristo, Tarlac City, Philippines.

This school has been named after St. John Bosco whom the Church has proclaimed Father and Teacher of the Youth. He dedicated his life to teaching. To continue this work, he founded a religious society of priests and brothers – the Salesians of Don Bosco (SDB).

The Don Bosco Technical Institute is made up of the Educative Pastoral Community. Its main components are the Salesians, the teaching and non-teaching personnel, the alumni, the parents, and the students.

History
Don Bosco Tarlac was opened in 1947 in the rented Oriente Hotel by Fr. James Wilson, an American army chaplain at Clark Air Base concerned with the Catholic education of the youth of Tarlac. Because of his devotion to the saint, he named his school St. John Bosco Academy. It transferred to its present site in Brgy. Sto. Cristo in 1948. In 1951, the school received its first Salesian, Fr. Anthony di Falco, SDB. From then onwards, it received a steady stream of Salesians who continued to improve the school. It started its technical curriculum in 1974 and four years later came to be known as Don Bosco Technical Institute. From a student population of 80 in 1947, it has grown to around more than 2,000 students at present.

The first Salesian educational institution, St. John Bosco Academy, was founded in 1947 in Tarlac. A second institution was established in 1952 at Victorias, Negros Occidental, and was followed by other schools in Mandaluyong in 1953, in Cebu and in Makati in 1954 and eventually in Bacolor, Pampanga in 1956.

The Seal of the School 
The seal of Don Bosco Technical Institute Tarlac consists of the gear, flask, laurels, and the anchor. The gear is the symbol of technical education. The flask symbolizes academic education provided by the school with special emphasis on science. The laurels point to the contribution of the institution in preparing capable citizens. The anchor is the symbol of Christ.

On its golden jubilee, the school added the motto in Latin under the seal: Ducere est servire (To lead is to serve).

Patron Saints

St. John Bosco 

Giovanni Melchior Bosco (August 16, 1815 – January 31, 1888), commonly called Don Bosco was an Italian Catholic priest, educator and recognized pedagogue, who put in practice the dogma of his religion, employing teaching methods based on love rather than punishment. He placed his works under the protection of Francis de Sales; thus his followers styled themselves the Salesian Society.

Bosco established a network of centers to carry on his work. In recognition of his work with disadvantaged youths, he was canonized in 1934.

St. Dominic Savio 

Saint Dominic Savio (April 2, 1842 – March 9, 1857) was an Italian adolescent who died at the age of fourteen. Today, he is honored as the patron saint of juvenile delinquents. He is the youngest non-martyr to be named a saint. He was canonized by Pope Pius XII in 1954.

Section patrons 
 John Cagliero
 Louis Comollo
 Leonardo Murialdo
 Elia Comini
 Luigi Variara
 Pedro Calungsod
 Józef Kowalski Analysis
 Francis Besucco
 Zeferino Namuncura
 Domenichino Zamberletti
 Joseph Cafasso
 Lorenzo Ruiz de Manila
 Alberto Marvelli
 Atillio Giordani
 Callisto Caravario
 Luigi Guanella
 Luigi Orione
 Istvan Sándor
 Jóse Calasanz
 August Czartoryski
 Joseph Quadrio
 Artimide Zatti
 Jose Aparicio Sanz
 Pascual Chavez Villanueva
 St Michael Stephen Mejia
 Luis Ricceri
 Philip Rinaldi
 Renato Ziggiotti
 Paul Albera
 Peter Ricaldone
 Michael Rua
 Egidio Vigano
 Carlo Braga

The Salesians of Don Bosco 
The Salesian community for school year 2022–2023 consists of:
Rev. Fr. Jerry T. Santos, SDB  – Rector
Rev. Fr. Ian O. Rosal, SDB – Administrator and Vice-Rector
Rev. Fr. Nestor S. Pidazo, SDB – Principal
Rev. Fr. April Jerome S. Quinto, SDB – Deputy Principal
Rev. Jose Isidro S. Torres, SDB – Assistant Principal for Pastoral Affairs
Cl. Jerick Magsino, SDB – Brother Assistant

See also
Don Bosco Technical College, Mandaluyong
Don Bosco Technical Institute, Makati
Don Bosco Academy, Pampanga
Don Bosco Technical Institute, Victorias
Don Bosco School, Manila

References 

Schools in Tarlac
Catholic elementary schools in the Philippines
Catholic secondary schools in the Philippines
Tarlac
Boys' schools in the Philippines
Educational institutions established in 1951
Education in Tarlac City
1951 establishments in the Philippines